The singles event of the 1991 Norstar Bank Hamlet Challenge Cup consisted of 32 players including eight seeded players. First-seeded Stefan Edberg was the defending champion, but second-seeded Ivan Lendl defeated him 6–3, 6–2, in the final. It was Lendl's 13th and last win against Edberg, taking their head-to-head to 13–10.

Seeds

  Stefan Edberg (final)
  Ivan Lendl (champion)
  David Wheaton (first round)
  John McEnroe (semifinals)
  Goran Ivanišević (first round)
  Jonas Svensson (first round)
  Alberto Mancini (first round)
  Omar Camporese (quarterfinals)

Draw

Finals

Top half

Bottom half

References

External links
 ITF tournament edition details

Singles